Hallelujah Here Below is the seventh live album by American contemporary worship band Elevation Worship. It was released by Elevation Church on September 28, 2018.

Hallelujah Here Below was nominated for the 2019 Grammy Award for Best Contemporary Christian Music Album.

Background
The album was recorded over a night in March 2018 at Elevation Church's Ballantyne campus in Charlotte, North Carolina, where previous Elevation Worship projects have been recorded. The Christian Beat noted the album consists of "honest confessions of brokenness mixed with soaring declarations of faith". Member Chris Brown said the album is about "how God doesn't ask for perfect praise", further stating:
We wonder what He could possibly want with our messy, dysfunctional lives. Because, after all, He's got a chorus of angels worshipping Him, singing endless and perfect praises around his throne in heaven day and night. And yet, I believe our King still loves the sound of the hallelujahs that come from broken, imperfect, but redeemed people here on earth. Our prayer is that this album would be a gate into His presence that helps usher in an atmosphere of worship in our lives.

Promotion
The first single, "Won't Stop Now", was released as an instant grat to those who pre-ordered the album on iTunes. Brown said the song is about "believing that our best days are ahead of us. And what God has planned for us is immeasurably more than we imagine." The band also announced the Hallelujah Here Below Tour along with the album, which is set to visit the United States East Coast and Canada from October. "Here Again" was released as the second single in August 2018, and "Echo" featuring Tauren Wells became the third of four planned singles to precede the album when it was released in September. The title track was released as the fourth single on September 14, 2018.

Critical reception

Alex Caldwell of Jesus Freak Hideout gave the album three out of five stars and called it a "mixed bag of tunes that mostly play it safe and stick to the well-established (and somewhat rote) formula of much of modern worship". Caldwell complimented lead single "Won't Stop Now" and the title track, and named "Echo" the standout track as its "rhythmic change here is a much needed directional turn from the sameness of much of the similar mid-temp rhythms and dynamics". In a review for New Release Today, Jasmin Patterson said the band has delivered an album that is "not only impactful spiritually but will also be a ton of fun to play and sing in personal or church worship settings". Patterson deemed the highlight a tie between "Echo" and "Then He Rose", calling "Echo" a song that "just connects with people and makes a heart come alive in worship" and "Then He Rose" a "powerful song about the resurrection of Jesus that would make a great addition to Easter setlists".

Accolades

Track listing

Personnel
Adapted from AllMusic.

 Lizzy Abernerthy – background vocals
 Luke Andersen – drums
 Jenna Barrientes – vocals
 Jonsal Barrientes – vocals
 Vincent Baynard – drums
 Chris Brown – acoustic guitar, producer, vocal producer, vocals
 Elisa Cox – strings
 LaShawn Daniels – vocal producer
 Garrett Davis – editing, engineering
 Nick Edwards – bass
 Steven Furtick – executive producer
 Sam Gibson – mixing
 Tiffany Hammer – vocals
 Caroline Hardin – strings
 Everett Hardin – strings
 Brad Hudson – background vocals
 Ted Jensen – mastering
 David Liotta – acoustic guitar, guitar
 Matthew Melton – bass
 Harley Monette – background vocals
 Matthew Moore – background vocals
 Davide Mutendji – background vocals
 Lanesha Owens – background vocals
 Roseanna Parker – background vocals
 Justin Raines – bass
 Aaron Robertson – keyboards, producer, programming
 Anna Sailors – vocals
 Joey Signa – guitar
 Kevin Smith – guitar
 Lauren Wells – vocals
 Tauren Wells – featured artist
 Brittany Wilder – background vocals
 Jane Williams – background vocals

Charts

Weekly charts

Year-end charts

References

2018 live albums
Elevation Worship albums